Florczaki  is a village in the administrative district of Gmina Łukta, within Ostróda County, Warmian-Masurian Voivodeship, in northern Poland.

The village has a population of 830.

Former German name of the village was Eckerdorf until 1945, belonging to the local capital Morungen (German, today Morag).

References

Florczaki